The USRA Light Pacific was a USRA standard class of steam locomotive designed under the control of the United States Railroad Administration, the nationalized railroad system in the United States during World War I. It was the standard light passenger locomotive of the USRA types, with a 4-6-2 wheel arrangement in the Whyte notation, or 2′C1′ in UIC classification.

History
A total of 106 locomotives were built under USRA control, and were sent to the following railroads:

After the dissolution of USRA, the ACL and L&N ordered additional copies of the USRA Light Pacific design, while both the Grand Trunk Western Railroad (GTW) and the Mobile and Ohio Railroad (M&O) also ordered copies in the 1920s.

Notable locomotives

Atlantic Coast Line 1504

No. 1504 is one of seventy USRA Light Pacifics built by ALCO for the Atlantic Coast Line Railroad (ACL). Classified as a P-5-A, No. 1504 had the capability to haul 10-12 passenger cars at 70–80 mph (113–129 km/h) between Richmond, Virginia and Jacksonville, Florida. It was assigned to haul the ACL's premier passenger trains such as the Miamian, Florida Special, Palmetto Limited, Southland, South Wind and Dixie Flyer. On December 25, 1952, ACL retired the No. 1504 locomotive from revenue service and put it on static display in front of their headquarters building in Jacksonville, where it became the only USRA Light Pacific steam locomotive preserved in original as-built condition.

In 1986, ACL's successor, CSX donated the No. 1504 locomotive to the Jacksonville City Council, where they relocated it to its new static display site in the parking lot of the Prime F. Osborn III Convention Center, located at the former Jacksonville Union Terminal. In 1990, the No. 1504 locomotive was designated as a National Historic Mechanical Engineering Landmark by the American Society of Mechanical Engineers (ASME). In 2021, the locomotive was purchased by the U.S. Sugar Corporation (USSC) in Clewiston, Florida, where it was being restored to operating condition for use in excursion service on the South Central Florida Express shortline railroad as part of USSC's heritage tourist passenger train named the Sugar Express.

Grand Trunk Western 5629

No. 5629 was a K-4a Pacific, which was a copy of the 4-6-2 USRA Light Pacific-type built by the American Locomotive Company (ALCO) in 1924 for the Grand Trunk Western. After completing a railroad club-sponsored excursion in 1959, it was purchased by Richard Jensen for further excursion service in the 1960s. It also pulled the Circus World Museum’s train from Baraboo to Milwaukee, Wisconsin on Chicago and Northwestern trackage. Unfortunately, the 5629's good fortunes were soon to change. In 1971, Jensen wanted to use the 5629 to pull an excursion trip on Penn Central trackage, which was cancelled due to insurance issues with passenger cars. Ticket buyers wanted refunds, and because Jensen had paid for some passenger cars to be moved to Chicago which never came, he was left with a heavy financial deficit. Worse still, as the 1970s progressed, Jensen broke his back from a fall while helping a friend move a refrigerator to a third-floor apartment, landing him in the hospital for several weeks. This crippled the rest of Jensen's finances and he could no longer afford to run any more excursions with the locomotive. He stored the 5629 at the Chicago, Rock Island and Pacific Railroad (CRI&P) freight yard in Blue Island, Illinois. 

In 1980, the CRI&P was filed for liquidation, as well as selling the Blue Island freight yard property to the Chicago commuter railroad, Metra, who ordered Jensen to move the 5629 to the nearby Iowa Interstate Railroad in order to redesign the Blue Island property and build a repair shop where the locomotive stood. However, Metra would not provide any assistance from Jenson moving his locomotive.

Instead, Jensen decided to sign a restraining order where only he was allowed to touch his locomotive and no one else was. The Court's ruling was that Metra was allowed the use of its property, but Metra could not move the 5629. Metra went back to court, asking relief, and got permission if it were not moved, to be scrapped. Metra were disappointed that No. 5629 was in poor condition, and they did want it to be scrapped. At that point, the Court threaten Metra to scrap the No. 5629 locomotive if Jenson did not move it out of the Blue Island freight yard. At that point, the Illinois Railway Museum (IRM) and the Mid-Continent Railway Museum (MCRY) were allowed by Metra to remove No. 5629 but could not have done so since it was owned by Jensen. 

By June 1987, Jensen had been banned from entering the Blue Island yard to access the No. 5629 locomotive, as he had been selling several parts off of the locomotive to local railfans, so much so that Metra feared that the steam locomotive had become a safety hazard. Metra continued negotiating with Mr. Jensen, including the IRM and MCRY, but to no avail. After the IRM and MCRY attempted to purchase the No. 5629 locomotive and move it out of harm's way free of charge without Jensen's permission, Metra contacted Erman-Howell, who scrapped the locomotive on July 14, 1987.

Grand Trunk Western 5632 
No. 5632 is a K-4b Pacific, which was also a copy of the USRA design, but with an all-weather cab. It was built by the Baldwin Locomotive Works in 1929, and it was donated to the city of Durand, Michigan in 1961, and it has remained on display there ever since.

References

Bibliography

Further reading

ALCO locomotives
Baldwin locomotives
4-6-2 locomotives
USRA locomotives
Standard gauge locomotives of the United States
Passenger locomotives 
Railway locomotives introduced in 1918